North Korea–United States summit may refer to:

 2018 North Korea–United States Singapore Summit, June 2018 summit meeting in Sentosa, Singapore, between Kim Jong-un and Donald Trump
 2019 North Korea–United States Hanoi Summit, February 2019 summit meeting in Hanoi, Vietnam, between DPRK Kim Jong-un and U.S. Donald Trump
2019 Koreas–United States DMZ Summit, June 2019 summit meeting in the Korean Demilitarized Zone, between Kim Jong-un, Donald Trump, and Moon Jae-in